The 2006–07 St. Lawrence Saints women's hockey team represented St. Lawrence University in the 2006–07 NCAA Division I women's hockey season. The Saints were coached by Paul Flanagan and play their home games at Appleton Arena. The Saints were a member of the Eastern College Athletic Conference and were unable to win the NCAA Women's Ice Hockey Championship

Regular season

Schedule

Player stats

Awards and honors
Sabrina Harbec, All-America honors (2007)
Sabrina Harbec, 2007 ECAC All-Tournament team
Annie Guay, All-America honors (2007)

NCAA Frozen Four

See also
St. Lawrence Saints women's ice hockey

References

Saint Lawrence
NCAA women's ice hockey Frozen Four seasons
St. Lawrence Saints women's ice hockey seasons